The Royal Postal Savings Bank is a Hungarian Art Nouveau building in District V of Budapest designed by Ödön Lechner. It opened in 1901.The building currently houses the Hungarian State Treasury.

It is emblematic of the Hungarian szecesszió style, which was part of the larger "secession" zeitgeist in European art and architecture at the time. The exterior of the building is covered in tiles from the Zsolnay Porcelain Factory and Hungarian folk art motifs. Decorative elements inspired by nature can be found everywhere, including large ceramic bee hives that sit a top the green patterned roof.

References 

Art Nouveau architecture in Budapest
Arts in Hungary